Iglesia de Santiago (Arlós) is a church in Llanera, Asturias, Spain.

References

Churches in Asturias
Bien de Interés Cultural landmarks in Asturias